Volleyball events were contested at the 2001 Summer Universiade in Beijing, People's Republic of China.

References
 Universiade volleyball medalists on HickokSports

U
2001 Summer Universiade
Volleyball at the Summer Universiade